The 1995 UIAA Climbing World Championships, the 3rd edition, were held in Geneva, Switzerland from 5 to 6 May 1995. It was organized by the Union Internationale des Associations d'Alpinisme (UIAA). The championships consisted of lead and speed events.

Medalists

Lead 
François Legrand won and defended his title once again. Robyn Erbesfield took her first Lead World Champion title.

Speed 
Andrey Vedenmeer and Natalie Richer were the 1995 Speed World Cup Champions.

References 

 IFSC Climbing World Championships
World Climbing Championships
International sports competitions hosted by Switzerland